Udhvaganathar Temple is a Hindu temple located at Thirumananjeri in the Kuthalam taluk of Mayiladuthurai district in Tamil Nadu, India. It is dedicated to the goddess Kokila.

Location 

Udhvaganathar Temple is located at a distance of 5 kilometres from Kuthalam on the Kumbakonam-Mayiladuthurai road.

Deity  

The presiding deity is Kokila.

Speciality 

Worship is offered by unmarried people and couples desiring children.

References 

 

Shiva temples in Mayiladuthurai district
Padal Petra Stalam